Landhi is a residential neighbourhood and an industrial municipality in the eastern part of Karachi, Pakistan. It is bordered by the Faisal Cantonment and Shah Faisal Colony to the north across the Malir River, Bin Qasim Port to the south and east, and Korangi to the west.

Demographics 
The population of Landhi was estimated to be over 660,000 at the 1998 census, of which 99% are Muslim. Muhajirs constitute an overwhelming majority of the population, followed by Pakhtoon, Sindhi and Baloch.

Economy
Landhi Industrial Area and Landhi Export Processing Zone are two major industrial areas where many companies have manufacturing facilities which include, Ghani Glass, Dawlance, International Industries Limited, Abbott Laboratories, and textile companies like Gul Ahmed, Al Karam, Artistic Millner, Feroz1888, Soorti, Yunus Textile, etc.

Neighbourhoods 
The town of Landhi is a middle-class area. The literacy rate in Landhi Town is more than 60%. Landhi Town has great educational institutions like National University(FAST), Mono-Technical College, Science and Commerce College, Maryam Girls College. Baber Market at Landhi 3 is the biggest Market of Town. Town Municipal Administration Office is at Landhi 5. This includes the neighbourhoods of Dawood Chowrangi, Quaidabad, Malir, Moinabad, Muslimabad, and Muzafarabad, which form a cluster in the eastern part of the town. The neighbourhood of Sharafi Goth in the north of the town along the Malir River is the least densely populated neighbourhood. The town was initially built for Mohajirs who came to Pakistan from India after 1947. It was generally a planned area but due to inefficiency of local governments and corruption at grass root and upper levels, this town is a Katchi Abadi. There were several forced takeovers of government parks and lands. Also encroachments of government land in front of houses and commercial areas has completely reshaped the Landhi Town.

 Awami Colony
 Bhutto Nagar is named after former Prime Minister Zulfikar Ali Bhutto
 Sher Pao Colony
 Dawood Chowrangi
 Future Colony
 Menhsera Colony 
 Khawaja Ajmeer Colony  is named after Khwaja Moinuddin Chishti of Ajmer.
 Burmee Colony is named for the Rohingya refugees who hail from Myanmar (formerly Burma)
 Korangi lies on the eastern side of Karachi between Karachi and Keti Bandar – the area extending from Korangi to Rehri Creek.
 Landhi is home to Babar Market, one of Asia's largest open air markets. Landhi railway station is also located in this area.
 Moinabad
 Muslimabad
 Majeed Colony
 Muzafarabad
 Sharafi Goth
 Sherabad

Trade and industry 
Landhi Town includes one of the four largest industrial estates in Karachi and will be the site of a new  industrial estate for small- and medium-sized businesses. The industrial estate benefits from the proximity of Port Qasim and Jinnah International Airport as well as rail and road links to the rest of Pakistan.

See also 

 Landhi Industrial Area
 City District Government
 Karachi
 Lahore

References

External links 

Geography of Karachi
Populated places in Sindh